Rear Admiral James Lillicrap (died 9 July 1851) was a Royal Navy officer who became commander-in-chief of the Cape of Good Hope Station.

Naval career
Lillicrap joined the Royal Navy in September 1780. He saw action at the Second Battle of Algeciras in July 1801 during the French Revolutionary Wars and commanded the sloop HMS Dispatch at the Battle of Copenhagen in August 1807 during the Gunboat War. Promoted to captain in October 1810, he was given command of the fifth-rate HMS Hyperion in January 1815. He became commander-in-chief of the Cape of Good Hope Station in September 1821 and, after commanding the third-rate HMS Gloucester from October 1823 and March 1824, became Captain-Superintendent at Portsmouth in April 1830 before retiring in June 1833.

References

Sources

Royal Navy rear admirals
1851 deaths
Royal Navy personnel of the French Revolutionary Wars
Royal Navy personnel of the Napoleonic Wars
Year of birth unknown